Jessica Sales (born October 15, 1951—disappeared July 31, 1977) was a college professor and community organizer in the Philippines who disappeared during martial law under the dictatorship of Ferdinand Marcos. She was a founder of Student Christian Movement of the Philippines at the University of the Philippines Los Baños.

Sales was arrested by state agents, at the age of 26, along with nine other activists working with community organizations in the Southern Tagalog region in the Philippines: Cristina Catalla, Gerardo "Gerry" Faustino, Rizalina Ilagan, Ramon Jasul, Salvador Panganiban, Emmanuel Salvacruz, Virgilio Silva, Modesto "Bong" Sison, and Erwin de la Torre. The group came to be known as the Southern Tagalog 10.

Sales' name is inscribed on the Bantayog ng mga Bayani Wall of Remembrance honoring martyrs and heroes of martial law.

See also
 List of people who disappeared

References 

1951 births
1970s missing person cases
20th-century Filipino women
Enforced disappearances in the Philippines
Individuals honored at the Bantayog ng mga Bayani
Marcos martial law victims
Missing people
Missing person cases in the Philippines
Southern Tagalog 10
University of the Philippines Los Baños people honored at the Bantayog ng mga Bayani
Year of death missing